Ab Chendar (also Romanized as Āb Chendār; also known as Āb Chenār) is a village in Abezhdan Rural District, Abezhdan District, Andika County, Khuzestan Province, Iran. At the 2006 census, its population was 81, in 20 families.

References 

Populated places in Andika County